Schizodactylus inexspectatus (often misspelled "inexpectatus") is a species of dune cricket (Schizodactylidae) endemic to sand dunes of Çukurova and Göksu Deltas, Turkey.

Taxonomic history
Schizodactylus inexspectatus was first described by Franz Werner in 1901 under the name Comicus inexspectatus. It was transferred to the genus Schizodactylus in 1931. The species was known from only a single individual and was not found again for almost a century, with the species generally thought to be extinct, but it was rediscovered in the Çukurova Delta after almost a century.

Description and life history
The cephalon and thorax representing more of the length than the abdomen.

Ecology and distribution
S. inexspectatus feeds on the mole cricket Gryllotalpa gryllotalpa, the beetles Scarabaeus sacer, Pentodon bidens, Scaurus puncticollis, Zophosis dilatata and Erodius orientalis, the German cockroach Blattella germanica and the ant-lion Myrmeleon. It lives in burrows in sand dune systems in eastern Turkey, especially in the Çukurova delta.

References

Ensifera
Insects of Asia
Fauna of Turkey
Insects described in 1901
Endemic fauna of Turkey